The John Desmond Bernal Prize is an award given annually by the Society for Social Studies of Science (4S) to scholars judged to have made a distinguished contribution to the interdisciplinary field of Science and Technology Studies (STS). The award was launched in 1981, with the support of Eugene Garfield.

The award is named after the scientist John Desmond Bernal.

Award recipients
Source: Society for Social Studies of Science

See also

 List of social sciences awards

References

External links
 Society for Social Studies of Science

Science and technology studies
Sociology of science